On 13 March 2022, during the 2022 Russian invasion of Ukraine, Russian Armed Forces bombed Mykolaiv with cluster munitions, killing nine civilians.

Victims and damage

Nine civilians waiting in line on the street at a cash machine were killed in the attack. The explosions also damaged houses and civilian buildings. Human Rights Watch analysed the incident and found that the Russian forces used Smerch and Uragan cluster munition on densely populated areas.

War crime analysis
Due to the inherently indiscriminate nature of cluster munitions, Human Rights Watch described their use in Mykolaiv as a possible Russian war crime.

See also
 War crimes in the 2022 Russian invasion of Ukraine
 Mariupol hospital airstrike
 Mykolaiv government building airstrike

References

Russian war crimes in Ukraine
Mykolaiv
Mass murder in 2022
Airstrikes during the 2022 Russian invasion of Ukraine
War crimes during the 2022 Russian invasion of Ukraine
March 2022 crimes in Europe
March 2022 events in Ukraine
Cluster bomb attacks
Southern Ukraine campaign
History of Mykolaiv Oblast
21st-century mass murder in Ukraine
Use of cluster munition during the Russian invasion of Ukraine
Battle of Mykolaiv
Airstrikes conducted by Russia